Howrah Malda Town Intercity Express is an Express train belonging to Eastern Railway zone of Indian Railways that run between  and  in West Bengal state of India. This train comes under the Intercity Express category.

Background
This train was inaugurated on 7 December 2007, flagged off by Lalu Prasad Yadav Former Minister of Railways for more connectivity between Kolkata and Malda Town.

Service
This train covers the distance of 332 km with an average speed of 48 km/h on both sides.

Routes

Traction
As the route of both side is fully electrified the end to end traction is now changed to AC traction that is ...The trains are now hauled by either WAP-4 or WAP-5 class loco of Indian Railway..

External links
 13465 Intercity Express
 13466 Intercity Express

References

Intercity Express (Indian Railways) trains
Transport in Kolkata
Rail transport in West Bengal